Alejandro Hernández Julia (born October 1, 1977) is a tennis player from Mexico.

Career
Hernández turned professional in 1995. A right-hander, he represented his native country at the 1996 Summer Olympics in Atlanta, Georgia, where he was defeated in the first round.

Hernández reached his highest singles ATP-ranking on February 24, 1997, when he became the 125th best player in the world.

Junior Grand Slam finals

Doubles: 1 (1 runner-up)

ATP Challenger and ITF Futures finals

Singles: 17 (8–9)

Doubles: 31 (18–13)

Performance timeline

Singles

External links
 
 
 
 
 
 

1977 births
Living people
Sportspeople from Tijuana
Mexican male tennis players
Olympic tennis players of Mexico
Tennis players at the 1996 Summer Olympics
Tennis players at the 2000 Summer Olympics
Tennis players at the 2003 Pan American Games
Pan American Games medalists in tennis
Pan American Games gold medalists for Mexico
Central American and Caribbean Games medalists in tennis
Central American and Caribbean Games gold medalists for Mexico
Central American and Caribbean Games silver medalists for Mexico
Medalists at the 2003 Pan American Games
20th-century Mexican people